The Schlettenbach  is a river of Saxony, Germany. It flows into the Red Pockau near Rittersberg.

See also
List of rivers of Saxony

Rivers of Saxony
Rivers of the Ore Mountains
Rivers of Germany